Hollinworth is a surname. Notable people with the surname include:

May Hollinworth (1895–1968), Australian theatre producer and director
Richard Hollinworth (1607–1656), English clergyman

See also
Hollingworth (surname)
Hollingsworth

English-language surnames
Surnames of English origin